Danylo Seredin is a Paralympic athlete from Ukraine competing mainly in category T38 middle-distance events.

Danylo competed successfully in the 2000 Summer Paralympics.  Winning silver in the 1500m and bronze in the 800m he was also part of the Brazilian 4 × 400 m relay that was disqualified.

References

Paralympic athletes of Ukraine
Athletes (track and field) at the 2000 Summer Paralympics
Paralympic silver medalists for Ukraine
Paralympic bronze medalists for Ukraine
Living people
Medalists at the 2000 Summer Paralympics
Year of birth missing (living people)
Paralympic medalists in athletics (track and field)
Ukrainian male middle-distance runners